The list of University of Houston people includes notable alumni, former students, and faculty of the University of Houston.  Class years usually indicate the year of a graduation unless an entry is denoted by an asterisk (*).  In this case, the student did not graduate from the university, and the class year indicates the last known year a former student attended.  In the case of alumni with multiple graduation years, the earliest graduation year is shown.

Legend
The following abbreviations and notes are used to represent UH schools and colleges:

Alumni

Academia

Arts and media

Architecture

|-

Entertainment and performing arts

Journalism

Literature

Visual arts

Athletics

Baseball

Basketball

Bobsled

Bodybuilding

Football

Golf

Gymnastics

Swimming and diving

Tennis

Track and field

Volleyball

Business

Government, politics, and law

Government

Politics

Law and law enforcement

Religion

Science and technology

Astronauts

Other scientists and engineers

Other

Honorary degrees
Individuals who have received honorary degrees from the University of Houston include Edward Albee, Donald Barthelme, Irvin Borish, George H. W. Bush, Rafael Ángel Calderón Fournier, Ernesto Cortes, Hugh Roy Cullen, Jan de Hartog, Loretta Devine, Christoph Eschenbach, Cristina Rivera Garza, David Gockley, Glenn Goerke, Barron Hilton, Eric Hilton, Gerald D. Hines, Oveta Culp Hobby, William P. Hobby Jr., Philip Guthrie Hoffman, Brien Holden, Philip Johnson, Edith Irby Jones, Bob Lanier, Jacques-Louis Lions, Lyle Lovett, Jim McIngvale, Carlos Menem, François Mitterrand, John Moores, Robert Mosbacher, Jim Nantz, Edison E. Oberholtzer, Rod Paige, Arnold Schwarzenegger, Ruth Simmons, Dinesh Singh, Song Jian, Margaret Spellings, Ron Stone, Herman D. Suit, Jack Valenti, Catalina Vasquez Villalpando, Welcome W. Wilson Sr., and Daniel Yergin.
(Bold names indicate UH alumni.)

Faculty and staff

Administration

Athletics

Government, politics, and law

Liberal arts

Performing arts

Visual arts

Science and technology

References

Dynamic lists

University of Houston people
University of Houston people